Celia Mary Twisleton-Wykeham-Fiennes known as Celia Fiennes and later Celia Rooke, (10 March 1902 – 17 September 1998) was a British artist, notable as a printmaker and book illustrator.

Biography
Fiennes was born in Ealing in London and was the daughter of Alberic Fiennes, (1865–1919), who worked at the Bank of England and his wife Gertrude, the daughter of a Royal Navy officer. Celia Fiennes was a direct descendant of the 17th-century travel writer Celia Fiennes.

Fiennes studied at the Central School of Arts and Crafts and when she graduated began working for the Arts and Crafts Exhibition Society in London. There she was largely responsible for organizing the Society's 1928 and 1931 exhibitions. During this time she continued to work as an artist. She produced a series of woodcut silhouette designs for the 1926 Golden Cockerel Press edition of The Fables of Aesop. Also in 1926, she produced twelve wood engravings for the Cresset Press edition of Matthew Stevenson's 1661 work The Twelve Moneths. In December 1932 Fiennes married Noel Rooke who had been one of her teachers at the Central School and was considered a leading light in the revival of wood engraving as a technique in Britain. In later life Fiennes turned from printmaking to concentrate on painting and in due course retired to a village near Banbury called Culworth where she died in 1998.

Works illustrated
 The Fables of Aesop, Golden Cockerel Press, 1926
 The Twelve Moneths by Matthew Stevenson, Cresset Press, 1926
 Together with a Diary for 1929, Cresset Press, 1929
 The Grave of Arthur by G. K. Chesterton, Ariel poem No. 25, Faber and Faber, 1930.

Notes

References

External links
  Works by Fiennes in the Central Saint Martins Museum and Study Collection

1902 births
1998 deaths
20th-century English women artists
Alumni of the Central School of Art and Design
Artists from London
British illustrators
English wood engravers
Celia
People from Ealing
20th-century engravers